Jeremiah Trotter Jr. (born December 24, 2002) is an American football linebacker for the Clemson Tigers.

Early life and high school
Trotter grew up in Hainesport Township, New Jersey and attended St. Joseph's Preparatory School in Philadelphia, Pennsylvania. He was selected to play in the 2021 All-American Bowl as a senior. Trotter was rated a four-star recruit and committed to play college football at Clemson over offers from South Carolina, Maryland, Georgia Tech, and Michigan State.

College career
Trotter joined the Clemson Tigers as an early enrollee in January 2021. He played in 13 games as a freshman and finished the season with 22 tackles, one tackle for loss, and one sack. Trotter was named a starter at linebacker entering his sophomore season. He was named the Atlantic Coast Conference (ACC) Linebacker of the Week for Week 7 after making 13 tackles in a 34-28 win over Florida State.

Personal life
Trotter's father, Jeremiah Trotter, was an All-Pro linebacker in the National Football League (NFL) who primarily played for the Philadelphia Eagles. Trotter is also a cousin of former NFL running back Terrance Ganaway.

References

External links
Clemson Tigers bio

Living people
People from Hainesport Township, New Jersey
Players of American football from New Jersey
Sportspeople from Burlington County, New Jersey
St. Joseph's Preparatory School alumni
American football linebackers
Clemson Tigers football players
2002 births